Flatfoot is a 1973 poliziottesco-comedy film directed by Steno. The film starring Bud Spencer obtained a great commercial success, generated three sequels. It is followed by Flatfoot in Hong Kong, Flatfoot in Africa and Flatfoot in Egypt. The title song is performed by Santo & Johnny.

Plot summary 
In Naples the Inspector Rizzo, nicknamed "Flatfoot", defeats a gang of drug traffickers. The criminals, from Marseille, were peddling drugs using frozen fish, but Flatfoot has managed to arrest them, with the help of a boss of the Neapolitan underworld, called Manomozza (snipped hand). After the arrest however, Flatfoot discovers that Manomozza did the double game and now intends to forge an alliance with the traffickers "Marseilles". Flatfoot, thanks to the tip from a friend, finds the place and time of the meeting between drug dealers, subdues them and sends everyone to jail.

Cast 
 Bud Spencer: Inspector "Flatfoot" Rizzo
 Adalberto Maria Merli: Police Commissioner Tabassi 
 Raymond Pellegrin: Lawyer De Ribbis 
 Juliette Mayniel: Maria 
 Mario Pilar: Manomozza 
 Angelo Infanti: Ferdinando Scarano, "'O Barone"
 Enzo Cannavale:  	Deputy Inspector Caputo 
 Nino Vingelli: Old Man of Camorra

Production
Steno stated that "For better or worse, Flatfoot was a crime flick, and I think that hadn't I directed Execution Squad, producers wouldn't have allowed me to do it."

Flatfoot was shot at Elios Film and Incir - De Paolis in Rome and on location in Naples.

Release
Flatfoot was released theatrically in Italy on 25 October 1973 where it was distributed by Titanus. The film grossed a total of 2.972 billion Italian lira on its release making Flatfoot the first and most commercially successful attempt at mixing the crime genre with comedy.

Footnotes

References

External links

1973 films
1970s crime comedy films
Italian crime comedy films
Films directed by Stefano Vanzina
Films scored by Guido & Maurizio De Angelis
Films with screenplays by Luciano Vincenzoni
Poliziotteschi films
1970s police comedy films
Films set in Naples
1973 comedy films
1970s Italian films